Pak Thok is a sub-district in the Mueang Phitsanulok District of Phitsanulok Province, Thailand.

Geography
The topography of Pak Thok is fertile lowlands. The sub-district is bordered to the north by Makham Sung, to the southeast by Hua Ro and to the west by Chom Thong. Pak Thok lies in the Nan Basin, which is part of the Chao Phraya watershed.

Administration
The following is a list of the sub-district's muban, which roughly correspond to villages:

Temples
 Wat Saeng Dao in Ban Saeng Dao
 วัดไผ่ค่อมรัตนาราม in muban 1
 วัดป่าสัด (บ้านตูม) in muban 2

References

Tambon of Phitsanulok province
Populated places in Phitsanulok province